The 2016 SBS Entertainment Awards presented by Seoul Broadcasting System (SBS), took place on December 25, 2016 at SBS Prism Tower in Sangam-dong, Mapo-gu, Seoul. It was hosted by Lee Kyung-kyu, Kang Ho-dong and Lee Si-young. The nominees were chosen from SBS variety, talk and comedy shows that aired from December 2015 to November 2016.

Nominations and winners
(Winners denoted in bold)

Presenters

Special performances

References

External links 

Seoul Broadcasting System original programming
SBS Entertainment Awards
2016 television awards
2016 in South Korea